The 1st Regiment California Volunteer Cavalry was a cavalry regiment in the Union Army during the American Civil War.  It was first formed of five companies as 1st Battalion, 1st Regiment California Volunteer Cavalry between August and October 31, 1861, at Camp Merchant near Oakland. After the battalion was organized it was sent to Southern California, three companies being stationed at Camp Latham, near Los Angeles, and two at Camp Carleton, near San Bernardino.  November 20–29, 1861, a detachment under Second Lt. C. R. Wellman was stationed at Camp Wright, and pursued and captured Dan Showalter's party west of the San Jose Valley and Warner's Ranch.  The battalion remained in Southern California until the spring of 1862, when it became part of the California Column, and formed the advance force of that Column during the march to New Mexico Territory and Texas.  In 1863, the Regiment was brought to full strength when seven more companies were raised to bring it to a full strength of twelve companies.  The five companies first organized were mustered out August 31, 1864, the terms of service of most of the men having expired.  Two new companies, B and C, were organized in New Mexico, by consolidation of the few men whose terms had not expired, and by new enlistments, and two new companies were enlisted in California, A and E, which, upon the completion of their organization, were sent to Arizona.  All of the companies of First Volunteer Cavalry (Companies B, C, F, G, H, K, and M) stationed in New Mexico and Texas, were ordered to assemble at Baird’s Ranch, near Albuquerque, to be mustered out of the service, during the month of September, 1866.  Company M was the last mustered out on the September 30, 1866.  1st Volunteer Cavalry Regiment spent its entire term of service in the western United States in California and New Mexico Territory and Texas.

1st Regiment California Volunteer Cavalry Commanders
 Colonel Benjamin F. Davis  August 19, 1861 - November 1, 1861
 Lt. Colonel Edward E. Eyre  November 1, 1861 - November 30, 1862
 Colonel David Ferguson  November 30, 1862 - November 6, 1863
 Colonel Oscar M. Brown  November 6, 1863 - December 31, 1865
 Lt. Colonel Clarence E. Bennett December 31, 1865 - October 19, 1866
 Major William McCleave October 19, 1866 - October 21, 1866

Company assignments
 Company A October 1861 sent to Camp Carleton San Bernardino County from Oakland. Duty there until March 1, 1862. Marched to Fort Yuma and on to Stanwix Rancho by March 16. March 29, 1862 Skirmish six miles beyond Stanwix Rancho on the Gila River. A small scouting party of the company under Lt. James Barrett engaged in battle at Picacho Pass in which he and 2 others were killed and 3 wounded April 16, 1862.
 Company B October 1861 sent to Camp Wright. November 20–29, 1861, Second Lt. C. R. Wellman pursued and captured Daniel Showalter's party near Warner's Ranch, west of the San Jose Valley. [2nd Lt. Wellman was in Company B according to Records of California Men in the War of the Rebellion.]
 Company C
 Company D
 Company E 
 Company F Mustered at Camp Stanford October 31, 1863.
 Company G Mustered at Camp Stanford June 12, 1863.
 Company H
 Company I
 Company J
 Company K Organized at Camp Merchant, Oakland, California; moved to Camp Morris in October 1863, in San Bernardino, California. Moved to Drum Barracks in December, 1863. Moved to Tucson, Arizona Territory in February 1864, then on to Camp Valverde and Fort Craig, New Mexico Territory at the end of March 1864, arriving in April and remaining until moving to Fort Union in August. Moved to Cottonwood Springs in October and returned to Fort Union in December 1864, remaining there until May 1865 when they moved to the Camp near Fort Larned, Kansas where they remained until moving to Camp at Lower Cimarron Springs in August, 1865. They returned to Fort Union November 1865, moving on to Camp Lincoln in December 1865 where they remained until May 1866 when they returned to Fort Union on June 30, 1866. The company assembled at Baird's Ranch, near Albuquerque, to be mustered out of service, during the month of September, 1866.
 Company L
 Company M Organized at Camp Union, California, July 1, 1863. Moved to Tucson via Drum Barracks, in February, 1864. At Camp Goodwin, Arizona Territory March 31, 1864. In Las Cruces, New Mexico from April to October, 1864, then moved to Hatch's Ranch, New Mexico. Moved to Camp at Blue Water Creek in November, 1864 and participated in the "Kiowa and Comanche Expedition," near Fort Bascom, New Mexico in December, 1864. It then returned to Las Cruces in January, remaining until May 1865 when they moved to Fort Selden, then Fort Craig in June, returning to Fort Selden until September 1866 when it moved to Baird's Ranch to muster out on September 30, 1866. It was the last company of the regiment to be mustered out.

See also
List of California Civil War Union units

References

Sources
 The California State Military Museum; 1st Regiment of Cavalry, California Volunteers
  Records of California men in the war of the rebellion 1861 to 1867 By California. Adjutant General's Office, SACRAMENTO: State Office, J. D. Young, Supt. State Printing. 1890. pp.68-167

Units and formations of the Union Army from California
Military units and formations of the United States in the Indian Wars
Military units and formations established in 1861
1861 establishments in California
Military units and formations disestablished in 1866
1866 disestablishments in New Mexico Territory